The 1995 Montana State Bobcats football team was an American football team that represented Montana State University in the Big Sky Conference during the 1995 NCAA Division I-AA football season. In their fourth season under head coach Cliff Hysell, the Bobcats compiled a 5–6 record (2–5 against Big Sky opponents) and finished seventh in the Big Sky.

Schedule

References

Montana State
Montana State Bobcats football seasons
Montana State Bobcats football